Baskervilla is a genus of flowering plants from the orchid family, Orchidaceae. It consists or 10 species native to Central America and South America

Species:
Baskervilla assurgens Lindl. - Colombia, Ecuador, Peru
Baskervilla auriculata Garay - Ecuador, Bolivia
Baskervilla boliviana T.Hashim -  Bolivia
Baskervilla colombiana Garay - Costa Rica, Nicaragua, Panama, Colombia, Venezuela 
Baskervilla leptantha Dressler - Costa Rica
Baskervilla machupicchuensis Nauray & Christenson - Peru
Baskervilla paranaensis (Kraenzl.) Schltr. - Brazil
Baskervilla pastasae Garay - Ecuador
Baskervilla stenopetala Dressler - Panama
Baskervilla venezuelana Garay & Dunst. - Colombia, Venezuela, Guyana

See also 
 List of Orchidaceae genera

References 

 Pridgeon, A.M., Cribb, P.J., Chase, M.A. & Rasmussen, F. eds. (2003). Genera Orchidacearum 3. Oxford Univ. Press
 Berg Pana, H. 2005. Handbuch der Orchideen-Namen. Dictionary of Orchid Names. Dizionario dei nomi delle orchidee. Ulmer, Stuttgart

External links 

Cranichideae genera
Cranichidinae
Orchids of Central America
Orchids of South America